Erika Stucky (born 1962 in San Francisco) is a Swiss musician, singer, composer, and accordionist, best known for her solo albums Jimi (2005), Princess (2005), Suicidal Yodels (2007), Black Widow (2013), Call Me Helium (2015), and Papito (2017).

References 

1962 births
Living people
Swiss composers
Swiss singers
Swiss accordionists